R. T. Greer and Company Root and Herb Warehouse is a historic warehouse located near Todd, Ashe County, North Carolina.  It was built about 1918, and is a two-story, rectangular, timber framed commercial building.  It is sheathed in corrugated metal sheet siding and rests on a brick pier foundation.

It was listed on the National Register of Historic Places in 2003.

References

Commercial buildings on the National Register of Historic Places in North Carolina
Commercial buildings completed in 1918
Buildings and structures in Ashe County, North Carolina
National Register of Historic Places in Ashe County, North Carolina